Arthroceras fulvicorne is a species of snipe fly in the family Rhagionidae.

Subspecies
These three subspecies belong to the species Arthroceras fulvicorne:
 Arthroceras fulvicorne fulvicorne
 Arthroceras fulvicorne nigricapite Nagatomi
 Arthroceras fulvicorne subsolanum Nagatomi

References

Rhagionidae
Articles created by Qbugbot
Insects described in 1966